The  Ōrongorongo River runs for  southwest through the Ōrongorongo Valley in the southern Remutaka Ranges of the North Island of New Zealand. The river and its associated catchments lie within the bounds of the Remutaka Forest Park, which is administered by the Department of Conservation.

The New Zealand Ministry for Culture and Heritage gives a translation of "place of Rongorongo" [a woman's name] for Ōrongorongo.

Ōrongorongo River is the main artery of the Remutaka Range, draining an area with rainfall of up to  a year, which is twice as much as the rainfall at the mouth of the river at Cook Strait.  For much of its course the river is a braided river, with a wide bed of greywacke shingle and gravel and a number of streams of water. The gravel bed can be seen as light-coloured areas of varying width in the adjacent image.

Because the rainfall in the Remutaka Range often comes in high-intensity rainstorms, the river is prone to violent floods.  The most severe of these floods sweep away most of the river's vegetated islands every 15 to 20 years. Between these floods, the shingle islands are gradually colonised by various low growing plants, followed by a host of native shrubs such as tauhinu and mānuka, and eventually small trees.

In December 2019, the approved official geographic name of the river was gazetted as "Ōrongorongo River".

Recreation
The Ōrongorongo Valley is popular with day walkers and trampers from the Wellington Region.  The most popular access is via the Catchpool Valley.  The four-hour return Ōrongorongo Track reaches the river where Turere Stream flows into it.  From there, a number of day and multi-day tracks, ranging from walking tracks to routes, continue deeper into the Rimutaka Forest Park.

Several Department of Conservation huts, some of them serviced, as well as basic private baches dot the Orongorongo Valley, mainly around the river's upper half.

Biodiversity 
The Ōrongorongo valley is home to the at-risk moth species Pyrgotis transfixa.

References

External links
 https://www.orongorongoclub.org.nz/ - Orongorongo Club

Rivers of the Wellington Region
Braided rivers in New Zealand
Rivers of New Zealand